Robert Johnson (born August 1, 1953) is an Arkansas accountant and politician serving in the Arkansas House of Representatives. Previously a Republican, Johnson switched parties to run for a seat in the state house, which he won without opposition in both the primary and general elections.

References

1953 births
Living people
University of Central Arkansas alumni
University of Arkansas alumni
People from Jacksonville, Arkansas
American justices of the peace
Arkansas Republicans
Members of the Arkansas House of Representatives
Arkansas Democrats
Businesspeople from Arkansas
American accountants
Baptists from Arkansas
21st-century American politicians